The Lauberhorn ski races (Lauberhorn World Cup alpine ski races (downhill, slalom, and combined) are among the highest-attended winter sports events in the world, attracting around 30,000 spectators each year. An established attraction is the airshow by the Patrouille Suisse, the aerobatic demonstration team of the Swiss Air Force. The 2016 races were held 15–17 January (super-combined, downhill, and slalom).

The races in Wengen in the Bernese Oberland are held in mid-January, usually the week prior to the Hahnenkamm, in Kitzbühel, Austria, another classic downhill race run since the early 1930s.

The Lauberhorn is a mountain in the Bernese Alps of Switzerland, located between Wengen and Grindelwald, north of the Kleine Scheidegg.

The downhill course is the longest in the world; its length of over  results in run times of two and a half minutes (about 30–45 seconds longer than standard downhill races); top speeds approach  on its Haneggschuss, the highest speeds on the World Cup circuit.

The Lauberhorn downhill run is surrounded by the Eiger, Mönch, and Jungfrau above the Lauterbrunnen valley.

Races are held on two famous courses "Lauberhorn" (downhill) and "Männlichen / Jungfrau" (slalom).

Key sections 

Many of the named portions of the course are due to historic falls or crashes by racers. The best known sections of the Lauberhorn downhill, or Lauberhornrennen, race are the following (in descending order):

 Russisprung (Russi jump), named after Swiss Olympic champion Bernhard Russi, in the upper treeless part of the course
 Hundschopf (dog's head), the Lauberhorn's signature jump over the rock nose, about a third of the way down the course
 Minsch-Kante 
 Canadian Corner, a long fall-away right turn
 Alpweg trail, very narrow and only  in width
 Kernen-S (formerly the Brüggli-S), consecutive right-left 90° curves separated by a small bridge), which reduces speed considerably; exit speed very important as the slower Langentrejen flats are next.
 Wasserstation (water station), a small tunnel underpassing the local railroad Wengernalpbahn
 Langentrejen where the slope becomes significantly flatter, now ends with Super-G turns
 Haneggschuss, a pitch after the flats where top speeds approach 
 Silberhornsprung (Silberhorn jump)
 Österreicherloch (Austrian hole)
 Ziel-S (finish-S) which is endurance challenging and finally a finish jump (reduced in recent seasons)

History

One of the first reports of skiing from the Lauberhorn to Wengen was in 1912 when the Roberts of Candahar Ski Challenge Cup was offered. By 1927 it was just known as the Lauberhorn Ski Cup.

It is one of the oldest continuously-held ski races. The Russisprung was originally built in the spring for a television show and was incorporated into the course by organizers the following year. The Minsch-Kante is where Josef Minsch fell in 1965 and was hospitalized for weeks. The Canadian Corner is named after two of the Crazy Canucks, Dave Irwin and Ken Read, who aggressively attacked this part of the course in 1976 and subsequently fell during the race. The Kernen-S was renamed for 2003 winner Bruno Kernen after his crash in 2006 at the former Brüggli-S. The Silberhornsprung was introduced in 2003 with the pyramid-shaped Silberhorn mountain in the background for television viewers. The Österreicherloch (Austrian hole) got its name in 1954 when almost all participating Austrian skiers (including Toni Sailer) fell there; 1960s Austrian great Karl Schranz later fell there as well.

In 1991, a tragic death occurred during training for the race at the Ziel-S (Finish-S). The young Austrian skier Gernot Reinstadler was not able to finish the S-curve properly and therefore jumped into the slope boundary (because he was too far to the right), where he hooked one ski in the security net and suffered severe injuries to the lower body. He died shortly after the accident from internal bleeding. The race was not held that year. In reaction to this tragic event, the slope boundary at that place was also equipped with rejection canvas and the gates were moved upwards and more to the left.

Snowmaking was added in the mid-1990s, and the combined race has been a run as a "super combined" since the World Cup debut of the format at Wengen in 2005. The super-combi consists of a shortened downhill and with a slalom run, both on the same day, instead of three runs (one downhill and two slalom) of the traditional combined. On the World Cup circuit, the traditional combined is usually not run as separate races, but determined "on paper" from the results of the primary downhill and slalom races, which are run on separate days. (The Olympics and world championships are the exceptions, holding separate races for the combined.)  At the Winter Olympics, the super-combined format replaced the traditional combined at the 2010 Winter Games.

Facts and figures
 Top speeds can exceed  on the Haneggschuss, a straightaway 25–30 seconds from the finish. Top speeds vary from year to year, depending upon snow conditions.
 The average grade of the downhill race course is 25.3 percent (14.2 degrees).
 The maximum grade is 87 percent (41 degrees) at the Hundschopf jump, one-third of the way down the course.
 The largest crowd was recorded in 2012, when 38,000 observed the Lauberhorn downhill race.
 The course was one of several featured in the 1969 movie Downhill Racer, starring Robert Redford and Gene Hackman.Redford's character challenges his rival teammate to a dual race at the end of practice on the Lauberhorn downhill course.
 The record holders for the most wins are Karl Molitor of Switzerland, who won six times between 1939 and 1947, and Ivica Kostelić of Croatia, who won the slalom race 4 times between 2002 and 2012, and the combined event twice, in 2011 and 2012. Unlike most of the other major ski races, the Lauberhorn in neutral Switzerland was held during World War II; all of the events were won by Swiss racers. In the post-war era, the most notable multiple winners are three Austrians: Toni Sailer with four straight (1955–58), Karl Schranz with four (1959, 1963, 1966, 1969), and Franz Klammer with three consecutive (1975–77). Switzerland's Beat Feuz has also won three times (2012, 2018, 2020)
 Austrians have won 31 times; Swiss racers have captured 29 victories (although 14 of these came before 1946).
 The first non-European to win the race was Ken Read in 1980, the sole Canadian, followed by four other North Americans (all U.S.). Lasse Kjus of Norway was the first Scandinavian champion in 1999, joined by Aksel Lund Svindal in 2016, as Norway swept all three events.
 The first American winner in the downhill was Bill Johnson, in 1984 on a shortened course; other U.S. winners include Kyle Rasmussen (1995), Daron Rahlves (2006), and Bode Miller (2007 & 2008). Miller and Marco Sullivan made the podium in 2009, taking second and third. Miller won the combined event in 2010, the second American to win the combined at Wengen and first in 52 years (Buddy Werner in 1958).  Phil Mahre is the only U.S. racer to take the slalom event at Wengen, in 1982.
 After heavy snowfall in 2016, the start was lowered to shortly before the Hundschopf jump.
 In 2021 races were cancelled because of COVID-19.

Winners list

See also
 Swiss Alps

Notes and references

External links
  

Alpine skiing competitions
Alpine skiing in Switzerland
Bernese Oberland
1930 establishments in Switzerland
Recurring sporting events established in 1930
January sporting events